was a Japanese waka poet of the late-Heian period. One of his poems was included in the Ogura Hyakunin Isshu, and forty-one of his poems were included in imperial collections.

Biography 
He was born in 1090. His given name was Fujiwara no Atsuyori.

He served as Lieutenant of the Stables of the Left. He entered religion in 1172.

He died in around 1179.

Poetry 
Forty-one of his poems were included in imperial anthologies from the Senzai Wakashū on.

The following poem by him was included as No. 82 in Fujiwara no Teika's Ogura Hyakunin Isshu:

His private collections have not survived.

References

Bibliography 
 
McMillan, Peter. 2010 (1st ed. 2008). One Hundred Poets, One Poem Each. New York: Columbia University Press.
Suzuki Hideo, Yamaguchi Shin'ichi, Yoda Yasushi. 2009 (1st ed. 1997). Genshoku: Ogura Hyakunin Isshu. Tokyo: Bun'eidō.

External links 
List of Dōin's poems in the International Research Center for Japanese Studies's online waka database.
Dōin (also listed as Fujiwara no Atsuyori) on Kotobank.

11th-century Japanese people
12th-century Japanese poets
1090 births
1179 deaths
People of Heian-period Japan
Japanese Buddhist clergy
Articles containing Japanese poems
Hyakunin Isshu poets
Japanese poets of the Heian period
Heian period Buddhist clergy